Below are the squads for the 2018 Women's Bandy World Championship.

Group A

United States (USA)

Russia (RUS)

Sweden (SWE)

Norway (NOR)

Group B

China (CHN)

Estonia (EST)

Finland (FIN)

Switzerland (SUI)

References 
 

Bandy World Championship squads